Lee Hyun-se (Hanja: 李賢世; born June 13, 1956) is a South Korean cartoonist, and the former president of the Korea Cartoonist Association. He is currently the chairman of KOMACON and a professor at the Department of Comic Animation at Sejong University.

Lee is Korea's leading comic ("manhwa") artist. His works advocated different times of our days and embraced public frustrations.

Early life and education
Lee was born in Uljin, North Gyeongsang Province, South Korea. He grew up in Gyeongju, South Korea, graduating from graduated from Wulseung Elementary School, Gyeongju Middle School, and Gyeongju High School.

Career
Lee debuted in 1978 with The River Knows that covers the Vietnam War. His major works include A Daunting Team, Mythology of the Heavens, Ring of Hell, Nambul: War Stories (hanja: 南伐), Armageddon, Police, Birdie, and others. Actor Joe Sang-gu is an old friend of Lee Hyun-se, and he is the real model for Oh Hyae-sung / (Kkachi), the main character of A Daunting Team.

Bibliography
1978,The River Knows
1979, Kkachi in Shimonoseki
1980, The Wind that Blows the Ground
1981, The Last Light of Shimonoseki; Kkachi's Fifth Season
1982, Kkachi's Blue Crab Apple, A Jackdow of the Border, A Dauntless Team; Made the cover of the first issue of monthly publication, Treasure Island
1983, Ring of the Wild; Kkachi's Glass Jaw; Ring of Hell
1984, Wanderer Kkachi; Kkachi's Sunny Spot; The Firebird's Fighting Spirit
1985, The High School Baseball Team; Thawing (Hanja: 解氷)
1986, Bow (Japanese Ver.); Run!; Emperor (Hanja: 帝王)
1987, Sing a Dawn, Lions; Fury of Kkachi's Head; The Kosmos that Blooms in Winter; Childish Kkachi; Roughly Unfortunate Fellows
1988, Report on the Daughter-in-Law's Rice Paste; Boss; Armageddon serialized in IQ Jump; Blue Angel; Karon's Dawn; Made the cover of the first issue of a monthly publication, IQ Jump
1989, Dancing Larva
1990, Chick Rhapsody
1993, Nambul: War Stories (Hanja:南伐); Police
1994, Steep Cliff (Hanja:峭崖)
1995, Armageddon (Animation); Golden Flower; Love Collection serialized in the newspaper Kyunghyang Shinmun (Hanja: 京鄕新聞)
1997, Mythology of Heaven
1999, Dark Dragon serialized in The Seoul Daily Sports; Made the National Police Agency character, Podori
2001, Serializing Mythology of Heaven
2004, Animal Drawing
2005, Serializing Wolf's Blood, Made Korean History
2007, Serializing Birdie
2009, Serializing Bijeongsigong; Changcheonsuhoui
2010, Serializing Red Fatale

Awards
1994, Awarded The Fourth Korean Comic Achievement Award
1999, Awarded The Third Asia Comic Contest (Hong Kong) Achievement Award
2002, Awarded The Second Gobow Comic Award
2006, Awarded The Metropolis of Seoul Culture Award
2007, Awarded Korea Content Awards President's Award in the Field of Comics

See also
Hand of the Dragon

References

External links
Lee Hyun-se's Oh Hye-sung

1956 births
Living people
Academic staff of Sejong University
South Korean manhwa artists